Ladoke Akintola University of Technology (LAUTECH) is a tertiary institution located in Ogbomoso, Oyo State, Nigeria. The university enrolls over 30,000 students and employs more than 3,000 workers including contract staff.

History
In 1987, Governor Adetunji Olurin, the then Military Governor of Oyo State (now split into two states: Oyo and Osun), received a request from the Governing Council of  The Polytechnic, Ibadan to establish a State University.  In 1988, he set up a seven member interministerial committee under the chairperson of Mrs. Oyinkan Ayoola, that recommended the creation of the university. By 13 March 1990, Nigeria's federal military government accepted the State's request. The edict establishing Oyo State University of Technology was signed on 23 April 1990, by Colonel Sasaenia Oresanya .

The first Vice-Chancellor of the university was Olusegun Ladimeji Oke. During the time, Late Bashorun M.K.O. Abiola became the first Chancellor in January 1991. The university began its first academic session on 19 October 1990, with a total of 436 candidates enrolled , four faculties namely Agricultural Sciences, Environmental Sciences, Engineering and Management Sciences, and Pure and Applied Sciences. A College of Health Sciences was established a year later.

The name of the university was changed to Ladoke Akintola University of Technology after the separation of Osun State from Oyo State.

Campus and academics
The university enrolls nearly 30,000 students in seven faculties and a college. LAUTECH also admits more than 150 students via JUPEB Direct Entry into 200/Level yearly. For two consecutive seasons, in 2003 and 2004, the Nigerian Universities Commission (NUC) rated LAUTECH as the best state university in Nigeria.

The main campus is in Oyo state. This campus is the site of the university's administration as well as home to six faculties and the post-graduate school. Fields of study include pure and applied science, medicine, agriculture, engineering and technology, and environmental science.

No other campus is located in Osogbo, The Osogbo campus has been renamed UNIOSUN Teaching Hospital (UNIOSUNTH) after the recent take over of LAUTECH by the Oyo state Government only.

Administration
The current principal officers of the university are:

Faculties

Units
 Office of the Vice Chancellor
 Registry
 Office of the Registrar
 Academic Affairs Unit
 Council Affairs Unit
 Planning, Budgeting & Monitoring Unit
 Personal Affairs Unit
 Academic Planning Unit
 Sports Development Unit
 Students Affairs Unit
 Bursary
 Library
 Physical Planning Unit
 Works and Maintenance Department
 Information and Communication Technology Center
 Open and Distant Learning Center
 Bookshop
 Farm
 Health Center

Conflict 
The ownership of LAUTECH has always been a source of conflict between the two-owner states (Oyo State and Osun State), especially after Osun State acquired her own university. The government of Oyo State wants Osun to transfer full ownership of the university to them while the other party disagrees. This conflict grew intense in 2010 under the administrations of ex-Governor Adebayo Alao-Akala of Oyo State and his former counterpart ex-Governor Olagunsoye Oyinlola of Osun State. The feud which was suspected to have been ignited by political interests was resolved eventually after series of intervention by notable political icons and the National Universities Commission in Nigeria. As of 20 November 2020, National Universities Commission (NUC) gives ownership of LAUTECH to Oyo State Government under Governor Oluseyi Abiodun Makinde.

Location 
The School Main campus is located at Ogbomoso North Local Government, Ogbomoso, Oyo State, Nigeria with geographical coordinate 8° 8' 0" North, 4° 16' 0" East.

This is where most of the university's teaching and research are carried out, The Ogbomoso Campus also houses the central administration of the university. The Ogbomoso Campus has five faculties and the Post-graduate school where courses are taught in various fields of pure and applied science, medicine, agriculture, engineering and technology, environmental science.

The College of Health Science campus is located at Osogbo, the capital of Osun State, Nigeria. The campus at Osogbo houses the 3-years clinical study for MBBS, Medical Laboratory Science and Nursing students (Pre-clinical years of study of these courses hold at the main campus in Ogbomoso). It is located at Isale Osun, Osogbo.

The Main campus first gate is located along the Old Ogbomosho-Ilorin road, the second entrance is at Under G area, and there's a pedestrian road at Adenike area. Lautech does not have a University hostel accommodation,so  areas such as: Adenike area,Yoaco, Under G, Aroje, Stadium are considered as residents for students.

Notable alumni

 Shina Peller - politician, owner club quilox, CEO Aquila records
 Seyi Olofinjana
 Samson Abioye - Pass.ng
 Peju Alatise - artist, poet, writer and a fellow at the National Museum of African Art, part of the Smithsonian Institution.
 Fabeku Victoria 
 Abiodun Oluwaseun — politician and Special Assistant to Oyo State Governor, Seyi Makinde on Project Delivery.
 DJ SUAG - A Pro DJ and Entertainner in Oyo state

Architectures and Monuments

References

External links
Ladoke Akintola University of Technology, Ogbomoso
Lautech Choir
Lautech Inaugural Lectures  
Lautech Postgraduates Portal
Lautech Undergraduates Portal
Lautech Undergraduates (Part-Time) Portal
Lautech Predegree Students Portal
Lautech JUPEB Portal
Lautech Open and Distance Learning Centre

 
Technological universities in Nigeria
Universities and colleges in Oyo State
Public universities in Nigeria
Educational institutions established in 1990
1990 establishments in Nigeria